The 32nd Thailand National Games (Thai:การแข่งขันกีฬาแห่งชาติ ครั้งที่ 32 “กรุงเทพมหานครเกมส์”) also known (2000 National Games, Bangkok Games) held in Bangkok, Thailand during 9 to 20 December 2000. Representing were 45 sports and 76 disciplines.  This games held in Hua Mak Sports Complex.

Venues

Ceremonies

Opening ceremony 
The official opening ceremony of this games has been 9 December 2000 at the Rajamangala National Stadium in Bangkok. It was opened by Princess Maha Chakri Sirindhorn. The torch was lit by Ann Thongprasom, Thai actress.

Closing ceremony 
The official closing ceremony of this games has been 20 December 2000 at the Rajamangala National Stadium in Bangkok. It was closed by Bhumibol Adulyadej, King of Thailand.

Sports 

 Aquatics (Swimming)
 Archery
 Athletics
 Badminton
 Baseball
 Basketball
 Billiards and Snooker
 Bodybuilding
 Boxing
 Bowling
 Bridge
 Cycling (Track, Road, and Mountain Biking)
 Dancesport
 Equestrian
 Fencing 
 Football
 Golf
 Gymnastics (Artistic and Rhythmic)
 Handball
 Hockey and ice hockey
 Hoop takraw
 Judo
 Kabaddi
 Karate
 Lawn bowls
 Muay Thai
 Pétanque
 Rowing
 Rugby football
 Sepak takraw
 Shooting
 Silat
 Softball
 Soft tennis
 Squash
 Taekwondo
 Table tennis
 Tennis
 Thai fencing
 Volleyball (Indoor and Beach)
 Weightlifting
 Windsurfing
 Wrestling
 Wushu

Top 10 Medals

National Games
Thailand National Games
National Games
Thailand National Games
National Games